Houane Rolande Tokpoledo (born 15 December 1992), known as Rolande Tokpoledo, is a Ivorian footballer who plays as a defensive midfielder. She has been a member of the Ivory Coast women's national team. She is nicknamed Tiotine, honoring her compatriot, late male footballer Cheick Tioté, who played at the same position of her.

International career
Tokpoledo capped for Ivory Coast at senior level during the 2018 Africa Women Cup of Nations qualification.

See also
List of Ivory Coast women's international footballers

References

1992 births
Living people
Ivorian women's footballers
Women's association football midfielders
Ivory Coast women's international footballers
Ivorian expatriate footballers
Ivorian expatriate sportspeople in Morocco
Expatriate footballers in Morocco